In molecular biology mir-281 microRNA is a short RNA molecule. MicroRNAs function to regulate the expression levels of other genes by several mechanisms. mir-281 is found in an intron of the Drosophila ornithine decarboxylase antizyme (ODA) gene. Using the RACE technique the pri-miRNA was shown to be 2,149 nucleotides in length. The expression level of the microRNA was found to be independent of the level of ODA.

See also 
 MicroRNA

References

External links 
 

MicroRNA
MicroRNA precursor families